The Legend of the Suram Fortress is a 1985 drama film directed by Georgian SSR-born Soviet-Armenian director Sergei Parajanov and Georgian actor Dodo Abashidze. Sergei Parajanov's  first film after 15 years of censorship in the Soviet Union, it is a film stylistically linked with his earlier The Color of Pomegranates (1968):  The film consists of a series of tableaux; once again minimal dialogue is used; the film abounds in surreal, almost oneiric power.

Plot 
The story is a retelling of a well-known Georgian folk-tale brought into written literature by the 19th-century writer Daniel Chonkadze.

Durmishkhan is a serf freed by his master. Now, he has to buy the freedom of his lover Vardo to marry her. He leaves his land and encounters a merchant named Osman Agha who tells his story. He was born a serf named Nodar Zalikashvili. After he had lost his mother due to his master's cruelty, he killed his master, fled, and embraced Islam to avoid persecution. Durmishkhan now starts to work for Osman Agha and marries another woman, who gives birth to a boy named Zurab. Meanwhile, Vardo becomes a fortune teller.  Osman Agha leaves his trade to Durmishkhan and converts to Christianity. In a dream a group of Muslims kill him for being a murtad.

Zurab grows up and starts to work with his father. Durmishkhan, having converted to Islam, has become a stranger to his land and people. Georgia comes under the threat of Muslim invaders and the king gives orders to bolster all fortresses in the country. However, Suram Fortress continues to crumble. Durmishkhan returns to Muslim territory. King's men come to Vardo the fortune teller to have her solve the mystery of Suram Fortress. Vardo tells that a blue-eyed young man of the country must be bricked up alive in order for the fortress to stand. Zurab sacrifices himself to save his country and its Christian faith.

Cast 
 Leila Alibegashvili as Young Vardo
 Zurab Kipshidze as Durmishkhan
 Dodo Abashidze as Osman Agha (older Nodar)/Simon
 Sofiko Chiaureli as Old Vardo
 Levan Uchaneishvili as Zurab (as L. Uchaneishvili)

Awards
1986: Sitges - Catalan International Film Festival - Caixa de Catalunya Award
1987: Rotterdam International Film Festival - Rotterdam Award
1987: São Paulo International Film Festival - Critics Award

Cultural references
Black metal band Voidcraeft used clips from the film for their song The Vertical Mammal.

See also 
The Suram Fortress

References

External links

1985 films
Drama films from Georgia (country)
1985 drama films
Soviet-era films from Georgia (country)
Soviet-era Azerbaijanian films
Georgian-language films
Films directed by Sergei Parajanov
Films about religion
Kartuli Pilmi films